Dennis Nilsson (born 21 March 1976) is a Swedish darts player and former strongman.

Career
Nilsson qualified for the 2012 PDC World Darts Championship, where he lost 4–2 to Japan's Haruki Muramatsu in the preliminary round. 
He represented Sweden with Magnus Caris in the 2012 PDC World Cup of Darts and together they were beaten 3–1 by Belgium in the second round, having defeated Japan in round one. He progressed through to the last 16 of the 2013 World Masters and was defeated 3–0 by Danny Noppert. A win over Steve Lennon saw Nilsson claim the 2016 Finnish Masters.

World Championship results

PDC
 2012: Preliminary round (lost to Haruki Muramatsu 2–4) (legs)

BDO/WDF
 2017: Preliminary round (lost to Ryan Joyce 0–3)
 2018: First round (lost to Jim Williams 2–3)
 2023:

References

External links

Living people
Swedish darts players
Swedish strength athletes
1976 births
British Darts Organisation players
Professional Darts Corporation associate players
PDC World Cup of Darts Swedish team